Arunchalam Aravind Kumar (born 17 November 1954) is a Sri Lankan trade unionist, politician and Member of Parliament.

Early life
Aravind Kumar was born on 17 November 1954. He was educated at St. Joseph's College, Gampola and St. Anthony's College, Katugastota.

Career
Aravind Kumar is a member of the Up-Country People's Front (UCPF) and served as its finance secretary. He was elected one of the vice-presidents of the Tamil Progressive Alliance in June 2015.

Aravind Kumar contested the 2004 provincial council election as one of the UCPF's candidates in Badulla District and was elected to the Uva Provincial Council (UPC). He was re-elected at the 2009 provincial council election.

Aravind Kumar contested the 2010 parliamentary election as one of the UCPF's candidates in Badulla District but the UCPF failed to win any seats in Parliament. He was one of the United National Front for Good Governance's candidates in Badulla District at the 2015 parliamentary election. He was elected and entered Parliament.

Electoral history

References

1954 births
Indian Tamil politicians of Sri Lanka
Indian Tamil trade unionists of Sri Lanka
Living people
Members of the 15th Parliament of Sri Lanka
Members of the 16th Parliament of Sri Lanka
Members of the Uva Provincial Council
People from Uva Province
Samagi Jana Balawegaya politicians
Up-Country People's Front politicians